Shur Kesh (also Romanized as Shūr Kesh) is a village in Firuzjah Rural District, Bandpey-ye Sharqi District, Babol County, Mazandaran Province, Iran. At the 2006 census, its population was 146, in 47 families.

References 

Populated places in Babol County